The broadbodied toadfish (Riekertia ellisi) is a species of toadfish only known from the coasts of South Africa.  This species grows to a length of  TL. Its binomial name honours two people: the generic name honours Dr. C. Riekert who sent J. L. B. Smith "many specimens", while the specific name honours P. V. Ellis who collected the type specimen.

References

broadbodied toadfish
Marine fish of South Africa
Endemic fish of South Africa
Monotypic fish genera
broadbodied toadfish